Šepulje is a village next to Križ in the Municipality of Sežana in the Littoral region of Slovenia.

The local church, built about 1 km southeast of the village, is dedicated to Saint Anthony and belongs to the Parish of Tomaj.

References

External links

Šepulje on Geopedia

Populated places in the Municipality of Sežana